Aubrey Gordon Neal (31 July 1893 – 26 September 1951) was an Australian rules footballer who played for the Melbourne Football Club in the Victorian Football League (VFL).

Notes

External links 

 

1893 births
1951 deaths
Australian rules footballers from Victoria (Australia)
Melbourne Football Club players